Live at the Fillmore Auditorium may refer to:

Live at the Fillmore Auditorium (Chuck Berry album)
Live at the Fillmore Auditorium (Widespread Panic video)